The  was an unsuccessful attempt by Nakajima Aircraft Company to meet a 1935 requirement issued by the Japanese government for a modern bomber to replace the Mitsubishi Ki-1 heavy bomber.

Design and development
Unlike in earlier projects, the Imperial Japanese Army issued in February 1936 detailed specifications that had to be met by the new aircraft. Structural strength was specified as well, including a load factor of 6 while at high angle of attack, and 4 while in a glide. Minimum bombload for short-range missions was to be  with a variety of load configurations. Other specified requirements were a crew of from four to six; engines to be either the Nakajima Ha-5 or Mitsubishi Ha-6; and three gun positions (nose, dorsal and ventral, each with one flexible 7.7 mm (0.303 in) Type 89 machine gun). The Hi-2 (Type 94) or Hi-5 radio, and other details were also specified.

Nakajima's veteran design team included Kenichi Matsumura as chief designer, assisted by Setsuro Nishimura and Toshio Matsuda, all of whom had previous twin-engine design experience on the Nakajima's licensed-produced version of the Douglas DC-2 commercial airliner project, and the short-lived LB-2 long-range attack bomber project for the Imperial Japanese Navy.

The Ki-19 was a mid-wing cantilever monoplane of all-metal construction with fabric-covered control surfaces. The aircraft had a bomb bay within a very streamlined fuselage as opposed to carrying the bombs externally. Douglas-type hydraulically-operated retractable landing gear and split-flaps were used.

Performance testing by the Tachikawa Army Air Technical Research Institute with the competing Mitsubishi Ki-21 lasted from March to May 1937. Evaluation was continued at the Army's main bomber base at Hamamatsu for bombing and other operational testing beginning in June. Not completely satisfied with the combinations of airframe and engines, the Army ordered to both Ki-19 prototypes to be powered by Mitsubishi Ha-6 engines, while the two prototypes of the Mitsubishi Ki-21 also converted to be powered by Nakajima Ha-5 engines.

Prototypes from the two companies were almost identical in performance, but the Army officially selected the Mitsubishi Ki-21 as the "Army Type 97 Heavy Bomber", Nakajima having lost the Army contract.

The fourth prototype was converted to the mail plane in April 1939 it got the new designation N-19. It was commonly referred to as the N-19 Long-Range Communications Aircraft and sold to the Domei Tsushin (Domei Press Agency), under registration J-BACN and was named Domei No.2.

Variants
 Ki-19 : Prototype for testing (2 units produced in 1937)
 N-19 : One prototype converted to mail plane.

Operators

 Imperial Japanese Army Air Force
 Domei Tsushin

Specifications (Ki-19)

See also

References
Notes

Bibliography

External links

 Axis History Forum

Ki-19, Nakajima
Ki-019
Abandoned military aircraft projects of Japan
Mid-wing aircraft
Aircraft first flown in 1937
Twin piston-engined tractor aircraft